Michaël Bultheel (born 30 June 1986 in Ypres) is a retired Belgian athlete, who specialised in the 400 metres hurdles. At the 2012 Summer Olympics, he competed in the men's 400 metres hurdles, making it to the semifinals, and ran anchor leg for Belgium in the 4 × 400 m relay finals, placing sixth. He set a then-personal best at London 2012 of 49.10, which he improved in 2015 to 49.04.

Competition record

References

1986 births
Living people
Belgian male hurdlers
Olympic athletes of Belgium
Athletes (track and field) at the 2012 Summer Olympics
Athletes (track and field) at the 2016 Summer Olympics
World Athletics Championships athletes for Belgium
Universiade medalists in athletics (track and field)
Sportspeople from Ypres
KU Leuven alumni
Universiade bronze medalists for Belgium